George Ho Cho-chi, GBS, OBE, JP (3 November 1919 – 4 June 2014) was a Hong Kong media mogul. The fifth son of the influential businessman Robert Hotung, George Ho was the founder of the Commercial Radio Hong Kong and Commercial Television.

Family and career
George Ho was the illegitimate son of Robert Hotung, then the most influential Eurasian compradore in Hong Kong, and Kate Archer. George was bequeathed a substantial amount of money directly and indirectly. His grandfather through Robert Hotung was a Jewish Dutch man Charles Henry Maurice Bosman. George Ho studied at King's College, Hong Kong and the University of California, Berkeley.

Instead of joining the family flagship company, George Ho founded his own business, Commercial Radio Hong Kong by obtaining a radio broadcasting licence through the connections and HK$50,000 inheritance from his father. George Ho gradually became an influential tycoon in the colony. He branched out into television, founding Commercial Television in 1975. But the station closed three years later.

He had also been director of Jardine Matheson Holdings, Hongkong Land and Bank of East Asia.

In 2001, George Ho was awarded a Gold Bauhinia Star for his contribution to society.

His son, George Joseph Ho, succeeded him as chairman of Commercial Radio.

See also
 Four big families of Hong Kong

References

1919 births
2014 deaths
Alumni of King's College, Hong Kong
Hong Kong businesspeople
Officers of the Order of the British Empire
Recipients of the Gold Bauhinia Star
Hong Kong people of Dutch-Jewish descent
University of California, Berkeley alumni
Ho family